Klaus Harnisch (born 13 December 1933) is a German director, dramaturg and cultural manager.

Life 
Harness was born in Halle/Saale.

From 1957, Harnisch worked as a director at various theatres in the GDR and from 1972 to 1981 as chief dramaturg of the music theatre at the Landestheater Halle (now Halle Opera House). In 1979 he wrote the libretto for the opera Büchner by Friedrich Schenker, which premiered in 1987 in the Apollo Hall of the Berlin State Opera. In the Directorate for Theatre and Orchestra at the Ministry of Culture of the GDR (DTO), he was head of the department of directors of music theatre from 1981 to 1990.

After the 1990 Peaceful Revolution, he became co-founder of the  support programme of the Deutscher Musikrat in 1990 and was its managing director from 1991 to 1999. As a retiree, Harnisch developed a workshop concept for interactive conducting and from 2002 to 2015 he worked as co-founder and project representative of the rector for Das Kritische Orchester - Werkstatt für interaktives Dirigieren on a voluntary basis at the Hochschule für Musik "Hanns Eisler" Berlin. In 2016 he was appointed honorary member of the Academy of Music "Hanns Eisler" Berlin.

Further reading 
 Klaus Harnisch, Büchner – Libretto, in Theater der Zeit 6/83.
 Dramaturgie eines Sterbens – Werkstattgespräch zu Friedrich Schenkers Oper Büchner in Musik und Gesellschaft 1/87.
 Büchner, Programmheft der Deutschen Staatsoper Berlin 21. February 1987.
 Peter Gülke, "Dank an Klaus Harnisch - Bitte keinen Ruhestand für den Mentor der jungen Dirigenten", in Das Orchester 6/99
 Interview, in Laetitia Devos – "Georg Büchner, vie et œuvre, sur la scène lyrique en RDA (1949-1990)", Diss. Tours 2009, .
 Klaus Harnisch, Das Dirigentenforum des Deutschen Musikrates – ein Glücksfall deutsch-deutschen Zusammenwachsens, in Festschrift 10 Jahre Dirigentenforum des Deutschen Musikrates 1991-2001, .

References

External links 
 

German theatre directors
1933 births
Living people
People from Halle (Saale)